The 2005 CONCACAF Champions' Cup was the 40th. edition of the annual international club football competition held in the CONCACAF region (North America, Central America and the Caribbean), the CONCACAF Champions' Cup. The tournament was also a qualifying event for the 2005 FIFA Club World Championship. Qualifying began September 21, 2004 and final rounds took place in 2005.

Costa Rica's Deportivo Saprissa won the title with a 3–2 aggregate win over Mexico's UNAM Pumas in the final. Saprissa had advanced with dramatic wins, once in extra time and once on penalties. Saprissa qualified for the 2005 FIFA Club World Championship in Japan, finishing third. 

This was the last time a non-Mexican team had won the CONCACAF Champions' Cup, now named the CONCACAF Champions League, and no other non-Mexican team would win the tournament until 2022, when the United States' Seattle Sounders also won against UNAM Pumas with a 5-2 aggregate on the 2022 final.

Qualified teams

North American zone
 UNAM Pumas - 2004 Clausura and 2004 Apertura champion
 Monterrey - 2004 Apertura runner-up
 D.C. United - 2004 MLS Cup champion
 Kansas City Wizards - 2004 MLS Cup runner-up

Central American zone
 Municipal - UNCAF champion
 Saprissa - UNCAF runner-up
 Olimpia - UNCAF third place

Caribbean zone
 Harbour View - 2004 CFU Club Championship winner

Bracket

Quarterfinals

Saprissa won 2–1 on aggregate.

Monterrey won 2–1 on aggregate.

D.C. United won 4–2 on aggregate.

UNAM won 3–2 on aggregate.

Semifinals

3–3 on aggregate. Saprissa won 5–3 on penalties.

UNAM won 6–1 on aggregate.

Final

First leg

Second leg

Saprissa won 3–2 on aggregate.

Champions

Top scorers

References

c
c
c
c